Tregawne is a hamlet in the parish of Withiel, Cornwall, England. It is between the hamlet of Ruthernbridge and the village of Withiel.

References

Hamlets in Cornwall